Knollys may refer to:


People
 Knollys (surname)
 Knollys family

Titles
 Knollys baronets, two Baronetcies created in the Baronetage of Great Britain
 Baron Knollys, a subsidiary title to the Earl of Banbury created in the Peerage of England
 Viscount Knollys, a title created in the Peerage of the United Kingdom

Other uses
 Knollys Rose Ceremony, annual event performed by the Company of Watermen and Lightermen of the River Thames.

See also
 Knowles (disambiguation)
 Knowles (surname)